Some Things Never Change (1997) is the album by the English rock band Supertramp.

Some Things Never Change may also refer to:
 Some Things Never Change", (1988) a song from album Total Devo by American new wave band Devo, 
 "Some Things Never Change" (Tim McGraw song) (2000)
 "Some Things Never Change" (Sara Evans song) (2008)
 "Some Things Never Change" (Dallas Smith song) (2020)
 Some Things Never Change" (2019), a song from the Disney film Frozen II